Thibault Ban (born 13 August 1996) is a Central African footballer who plays as a defender for Anges de Fatima and the Central African Republic national team.

Club career
Ban debuted with the Central African Republic national team in a 0–0 2019 Africa Cup of Nations qualification tie with Ivory Coast on 16 October 2016.

References

External links
 

1996 births
Living people
Central African Republic footballers
Central African Republic international footballers
Association football defenders